Linda Sorgini (born 1955) is a Canadian actress who works primarily in Quebec. She is most noted for her performance in the 1983 film The Tin Flute (Bonheur d'occasion), for which she was a Genie Award nominee for Best Supporting Actress at the 5th Genie Awards in 1984.

A native of Sudbury, Ontario, she studied theatre at the University of Ottawa and the National Theatre School of Canada.

Her other performances have included the films Brother André (Le Frère André), Cruising Bar, Ding et Dong, The Ideal Man (L'Homme idéal), Streetheart (Le cœur au poing) and Without Her (Sans elle), the television series Watatatow, L'Auberge du chien noir, Plan B and Au secours de Béatrice, and roles on stage.

References

External links

20th-century Canadian actresses
21st-century Canadian actresses
Canadian film actresses
Canadian television actresses
Canadian stage actresses
Actresses from Greater Sudbury
Actresses from Montreal
Franco-Ontarian people
University of Ottawa alumni
National Theatre School of Canada alumni
Living people
1955 births